Krasnensky is a rural locality (a khutor) in Pchegatlukayskoye Rural Settlement of Teuchezhsky District, the Republic of Adygea, Russia. The population was 383 as of 2018. There are 9 streets.

Geography 
Krasnensky is located 29 km west of Ponezhukay (the district's administrative centre) by road. Kochkin is the nearest rural locality.

References 

Rural localities in Teuchezhsky District